Robert Malcolm Harris (born 9 February 1941) was the Governor of Anguilla for the period December 1996 – 27 January 2000. He became acting government after Alan Hoole became seriously ill.

References 

1941 births
Living people
Governors of Anguilla